Frank Davidson (30 December 1912 – 28 December 1999) was a South African cricketer. He played in three first-class matches in 1938/39 and 1939/40.

References

External links
 

1912 births
1999 deaths
South African cricketers
Border cricketers
Rhodesia cricketers
People from Vryburg